Mark Hughes (born October 5, 1966, in Muskegon, Michigan) is an American former professional basketball player, coach, and is the current Assistant General Manager of the Los Angeles Clippers. Hughes was a star at Reeths-Puffer High School in Muskegon, Michigan where he led the Rockets to the Class B State Semifinal in 1985. Hughes also ended up earning First team All State honors.

He has played collegiately for University of Michigan (1985–89) and was a co-captain of the 1989 NCAA Championship team. On the professional level, he had signed with the Detroit Pistons (1991) and Toronto Raptors (1996) in the National Basketball Association. He has played professionally in France and Italy (for Scaini Venezia in 1991–93).

He was the head coach of the Grand Rapids Hoops of the CBA from 1997 to 2002, the team he has also played for from 1995 to 1998.

He worked as an assistant coach in the NBA for the Orlando Magic (2002–04) and Sacramento Kings (2006–07).

During the 2007–11 seasons, Hughes worked as a scout for the New York Knicks. In 2011, Hughes became the Director of Player Personnel for the Knicks. As of August 2017, he is the Assistant GM of the Los Angeles Clippers

References 

1966 births
Living people
American expatriate basketball people in France
American expatriate basketball people in Italy
American men's basketball coaches
American men's basketball players
Basketball coaches from Michigan
Basketball players from Michigan
Continental Basketball Association coaches
Grand Rapids Hoops players
Los Angeles Clippers executives
Michigan Wolverines men's basketball players
New York Knicks executives
Orlando Magic assistant coaches
Sacramento Kings assistant coaches
Sportspeople from Muskegon, Michigan